The Fest is an annual music festival in Gainesville, Florida, United States, organized by Tony Weinbender, formerly of No Idea Records. It is a predominantly punk rock and pop-punk festival, though there are also a good number of indie rock, hardcore punk, metal, and ska acts.

The Fest takes place each year on the weekend of the Florida–Georgia football game (around Halloween) held in Jacksonville.

History

The Fest first took place May 24 and 25, 2002, and has since attracted a large turnout throughout the years. Bands perform across a variety of venues (varying from small bars to large concert halls) in the downtown Gainesville area.

Fest 20, held October 28-30, 2022, featured headlining acts such as Hot Water Music, The Mezningers, Anti-Flag, The Flatliners, Avail, and Samiam, as well as hundreds of other bands including The Bollweevils, Celebration Summer, SPELLS, The Dopamines, Kali Masi, Heavy Seas, and more.

See also 
Fested: A Journey to Fest 7
List of punk rock festivals
List of historic rock festivals

References

External links 
 Official website

2002 establishments in Florida
Culture of Gainesville, Florida
Heavy metal festivals in the United States
Music festivals established in 2002
Music festivals in Florida
Music organizations based in the United States
Punk rock festivals
Rock festivals in the United States